Edavanakad  is a part of Vypin islands, which comes under the Ernakulam district of Kerala, India. It is a suburb of Kochi city. The Vypin - Munambam state highway passes through the village. Its western border is Arabian Sea, the eastern Border is Vembanadu Lake, the northern border is Kuzhupilly village and the southern Border is Nayarambalam village.

General information
"Edavanakkad" is known as the heart of Vypin. It is the smallest village in Vypin Island. It contains 15 wards.

Educational institutions

HIHSS 
(Hidayahtul Islam Higher Secondary School)
K P M H S
(kumarapanikkar memorial high school)
Agasthya Siddha vaidhya ashram is also in this place.

Notable People

Vincent (actor)

References 

Villages in Ernakulam district